Gliese 86 (13 G. Eridani, HD 13445) is a K-type main-sequence star approximately 35 light-years away in the constellation of Eridanus.  It has been confirmed that a white dwarf orbits the primary star. In 1998 the European Southern Observatory announced that an extrasolar planet was orbiting the star.

Stellar components
The primary companion (Gliese 86 A) is a K-type main-sequence star of spectral type K1V. The characteristics in comparison to the Sun are 83% the mass, 79% the radius, and 50% the luminosity. The star has a close-orbiting massive Jovian planet.

Gliese 86 B is a white dwarf located around 21 AU from the primary star, making the Gliese 86 system one of the tightest binaries known to host an extrasolar planet. It was discovered in 2001 and initially suspected to be a brown dwarf, but high contrast observations in 2005 suggested that the object is probably a white dwarf, as its spectrum does not exhibit molecular absorption features which are typical of brown dwarfs. Assuming the white dwarf has a mass about half that of the Sun and that the linear trend observed in radial velocity measurements is due to Gliese 86 B, a plausible orbit for this star around Gliese 86 A has a semimajor axis of 18.42 AU and an eccentricity of 0.3974. When both stars were on the main sequence, the separation between the two stars was closer, at around 9 AU. More precise measurements for the white dwarf give it a mass of 55% the mass of the Sun and a temperature of around 8200 K.

Planetary system
The preliminary astrometric measurements made with the Hipparcos space probe suggest the planet has an orbital inclination of 164.0° and a mass 15 times Jupiter, which would make the object a brown dwarf. However, further analysis suggests the Hipparcos measurements are not precise enough to reliably determine astrometric orbits of substellar companions, thus the orbital inclination and true mass of the candidate planet remain unknown. It was discovered by the Swiss 1.2 m Leonhard Euler Telescope operated by the Geneva Observatory. Such an object was formed from a protoplanetary disk that was truncated at 2 AU from the parent star.

The radial velocity measurements of Gliese 86 show a linear trend once the motion due to this planet are taken out. This may be associated with the orbital motion of the white dwarf companion.

See also
 Map analysis of the 1961 Zeta Reticuli Incident
 List of extrasolar planets

References

External links
 

 
K-type main-sequence stars
White dwarfs
Gliese, 0086
Planetary systems with one confirmed planet
?
Eridani, 13
010138
013445
Durchmusterung objects
0086
0637
TIC objects